Sir Adam Maitland (25 May 1885 – 5 October 1949) was a British Conservative Party politician who served as the Member of Parliament (MP) for Faversham in Kent. He entered Parliament as a result of the 25 January 1928 Faversham by-election, and held his seat until 1945. An accountant by profession, he was a Fellow of the Society of Accountants and Auditors. He received a knighthood in 1936, had been a director of the Pall Mall Gazette and Globe, and a director of the London board of the Royal Exchange Assurance.

Personal
Maitland was born in Bury, Lancashire, on 25 May 1885 to Joseph Maitland (b.~1853) of Aberdeenshire and his wife Mary (b.~1855). Educated privately, on 6 Sep 1911, he married Nancy Helen, the daughter of Henry Chadwick of Bury, Lancs.

References

See also
List of United Kingdom by-elections (1918–1931)
 List of MPs elected in the United Kingdom general election of 1935, 1931, and 1929

1885 births
1949 deaths
Conservative Party (UK) MPs for English constituencies
UK MPs 1924–1929
UK MPs 1929–1931
UK MPs 1931–1935
UK MPs 1935–1945
People from Bury, Greater Manchester